George Crerar (1 October 1914 - 6 December 1986) was a Scotland international cricketer. He was also a  Scottish rugby union player. He was the 83rd President of the Scottish Rugby Union.

Rugby Union career

Amateur career

He played for Glasgow Academicals.

Provincial career

He played for Glasgow District in the 1937 inter-city match.

Administrative career

He became the 83rd President of the Scottish Rugby Union. He served the standard one year from 1969 to 1970.

Cricket career

Crerar played cricket for Glasgow Academicals. He also represented the Scotland international side.

References

1986 deaths
1914 births
Cricketers from Glasgow
Scottish rugby union players
Presidents of the Scottish Rugby Union
Rugby union players from Glasgow
Glasgow Academicals rugby union players
Scottish cricketers
Glasgow District (rugby union) players
Rugby union centres